Grafters is a 1917 American silent drama film directed by Arthur Rosson and starring Jack Devereaux, Anna Lehr and Frank Currier. Director Allan Dwan supervised the shooting of the film.

Cast
 Jack Devereaux as Jack Towne
 Anna Lehr as Doris Ames
 Frank Currier as Mark Towne
 Irene Leonard as Mrs. Ames
 George Siegmann as The Menace
 Robert Crimmins as Laughing Louie

References

Bibliography
 Robert B. Connelly. The Silents: Silent Feature Films, 1910-36, Volume 40, Issue 2. December Press, 1998.

External links
 

1917 films
1917 drama films
1910s English-language films
American silent feature films
Silent American drama films
American black-and-white films
Triangle Film Corporation films
Films directed by Arthur Rosson
1910s American films